Henry Roughton Hogg (9 February 1846 – 30 November 1923) was a British amateur arachnologist.

Biography
Born in Stockwell, Surrey, he attended Uppingham School from 1859-1862, and later studied at Christ's College, Cambridge, where he obtained his BA in 1868 and his MA in 1873.

He settled in Australia in 1873 and took up business in Melbourne, founding the firm of Hogg, Robinson & Co. He married in 1881, and in 1900 returned to England and settled in the London district of Kensington. He became chairman of Sunderland District Electric Tramways ltd and a director of Sanderson, Murray & Elder Ltd.

Hogg was a specialist of the spiders of Australia and New Zealand. He was a fellow and honorary treasurer of the Royal Society of Victoria, as well as a fellow of both the Zoological and Botanical Societies of London.  He bequeathed his collections to the Natural History Museum of London.

The genus  Hoggicosa is named for the author.

He died on the 30th November, 1923 and was buried on the eastern side of Highgate Cemetery.

References

External links

British arachnologists
1846 births
1923 deaths
Burials at Highgate Cemetery
People from Stockwell
Alumni of Christ's College, Cambridge
Fellows of the Zoological Society of London